Peter Skoronski (born July 31, 2001) is an American football offensive tackle for the Northwestern Wildcats. He is the grandson of Bob Skoronski, who won five NFL championships as a tackle for the Green Bay Packers.

Career
Skoronski attended Maine South High School in Park Ridge, Illinois. He was selected to play in the 2020 All-American Bowl. He committed to Northwestern University to play college football.

Skoronski started all nine games his freshman year at Northwestern in 2020. As a sophomore in 2021, he started all 12 games and was named first-team All-Big Ten.

References

External links

Northwestern Wildcats bio

Living people
All-American college football players
American football offensive tackles
Northwestern Wildcats football players
People from Park Ridge, Illinois
Players of American football from Illinois
2001 births